Tezozomoctli (originally Teçoçomoctli; ruled 1418–1430) was a tlatoani ("ruler" or "king") of the pre-Columbian Nahua altepetl (city-state) of Cuauhtitlan in central Mexico. His palace was located at Huexocalco.

Tezozomoctli was born in the Mexica city of Tlatelolco. His father was Tlacateotl, who was the second tlatoani of Tlatelolco. His mother was Xiuhtomiyauhtzin, the daughter of the tlatoani of Coatl Ichan, Acolmiztli. Tezozomoctli was probably named after his great-grandfather, the powerful ruler of Azcapotzalco.

In the Tepanec War in the year 3 Rabbit (1430), Cuauhtitlan was attacked and defeated by the combined forces of the surrounding peoples. After being informed at his refuge at Cincoc Huehuetocan that Cuauhtitlan had been captured, Tezozomoctli travelled to Atzompan where he allegedly committed suicide by poison.

Notes

References

Nahua nobility
Tlatoque
15th-century monarchs in North America
15th-century indigenous people of the Americas
Year of birth unknown
1430 deaths
Suicides by poison
Suicides in North America
Nobility of the Americas